Antoine Reinartz (born 1985) is a French actor.

Theater

Selected filmography

References

External links 

1985 births
Living people
French male film actors